The name Kalmaegi has been used to name four tropical cyclones in the northwestern Pacific Ocean. It was submitted by North Korea and is a type of seagull.

Tropical Storm Kalmaegi (2002) (T0210, 14W)
Typhoon Kalmaegi (2008) (T0807, 08W, Helen) – struck Taiwan and China.
Typhoon Kalmaegi (2014) (T1415, 15W, Luis) – a storm which brought flooding in southeast Asia during mid-September.
Typhoon Kalmaegi (2019) (T1926, 27W, Ramon) – impacted northern Philippines during mid-November.

Pacific typhoon set index articles